Lake Rotoehu is the smallest in a chain of three lakes to the northeast of Lake Rotorua in New Zealand's North Island. It is located between the city of Rotorua and town of Whakatane. The southern end of the lake occupies part of the Okataina caldera. It is fed (underground seepage) by Lake Rotoma to the east, and flows westward joining Lake Rotoiti.
The lake is one of the least visited, but offers great Kayaking and fishing (rainbow trout). It has two access points, Otautu Bay and Kennedy Bay and is well located centrally to many other places e.g. the ocean, mountain biking, hiking etc. It has very good wildlife and birdlife with several rarely seen birds.  In particular the endangered Kokako is located close by.

References

External links 

 Rotoma-Rotoehu Resident and Ratepayers Assn A website for the area

Okataina Volcanic Centre
Lakes of the Bay of Plenty Region
Volcanic crater lakes
Taupō Volcanic Zone